Non-homologous end-joining factor 1 (NHEJ1), also known as Cernunnos or XRCC4-like factor (XLF), is a protein that in humans is encoded by the NHEJ1 gene.  XLF was originally discovered as the protein mutated in five patients with growth retardation, microcephaly, and immunodeficiency.  The protein is required for the non-homologous end joining (NHEJ) pathway of DNA repair.  Patients with XLF mutations also have immunodeficiency due to a defect in V(D)J recombination, which uses NHEJ to generate diversity in the antibody repertoire of the immune system.  XLF interacts with DNA ligase IV and XRCC4 and is thought to be involved in the end-bridging or ligation steps of NHEJ.  The yeast (Saccharomyces cerevisiae) homolog of XLF is Nej1.

Phenotypes 

In contrast to the profound immunodeficiency phenotype of XLF deletion in humans, deletion of XLF alone has a mild phenotype in mice.   However, combining a deletion of XLF with deletion of the ATM kinase causes a synthetic defect in NHEJ, suggesting partial redundancy in the function of these two proteins in mice.

Structure 

XLF is structurally similar to XRCC4, existing as a constitutive dimer with an N-terminal globular head domain, an alpha-helical stalk, and an unstructured C-terminal region (CTR).

Interactions 

XLF has been shown to interact with XRCC4,  and with Ku protein, and it can also interact weakly with DNA. Co-crystal structures of XLF and XRCC4 suggest that the two proteins can form hetero-oligomers via head-to-head interaction of alternating XLF and XRCC4 subunits.  These XRCC4-XLF filaments have been proposed to bridge DNA prior to end ligation during NHEJ.  Formation of XRCC4-XLF oligomers can be disrupted by interaction of the C-terminal domain of XRCC4 with the BRCT domain of DNA ligase IV.

Hematopoietic stem cell aging 

Deficiency of NHEJ1 in mice leads to premature aging of hematopoietic stem cells as indicated by several lines of evidence including evidence that long-term repopulation is defective and worsens over time.  Using a human induced pluripotent stem cell model of NHEJ1 deficiency, it was shown that NHEJ1 has an important role in promoting survival of the primitive hematopoietic progenitors.  These NHEJ1 deficient cells possess a weak NHEJ1-mediated repair capacity that is apparently incapable of coping with DNA damages induced by physiological stress, normal metabolism, and ionizing radiation.

References

Further reading 

 
 
 
 
 
 
 
 
 
 
 

Proteins